Alan John Roper (born 21 May 1939) is an English former professional footballer. He made 53 appearances in the Football League for Walsall.

References

 
 Express and Star, 10 May 1982
 Midlands Today, 27 March 2014

1939 births
Living people
English footballers
People with Alzheimer's disease
Walsall F.C. players
Wolverhampton Wanderers F.C. players
English Football League players
Association football defenders